Kitivo is a small village in Lushoto District in the Tanga Region of Tanzania. It is an exceedingly poor village and struggles to stay afloat.

Kitivo Secondary School 
Located in the village is a secondary school, partnered with Bramhall High School in England.

For the last few years, Bramhall High School students have raised money to help the students and teachers in Kitivo.

Life in school 
The students have a few old computers that have been donated by Bramhall High. They cannot use many because of the lack of power to the school. Bramhall High organized a sponsored walk to Lyme Park and back, a distance of about 10 kilometers. They hope to raise £30,000 to help pay for a solar cell, a toilet block and a kitchen. To attend Kitivo Secondary School it costs £100 a year which is a lot of money for the people who live in Kitivo; school meals cost £50 a term. 

In 1973, with the help from Bramhall High, they built a Girls' Hostel, which houses 700 girls while they are in school. It has no windows and is very basic but the girls adore it. 

Over the years the weather has changed dramatically.  Now the weather is 50 degrees this means that it affects the children terribly.  They cannot find much water around the streets as it is all very contaminated due to hot air and bugs. Most of the water has evaporated.

References

 
 Kitivo, south Africa, United Rep. of Page at Falling Rain

Populated places in Tanga Region